The 1950–51 Syracuse Nationals season was the 5th season of the franchise and the second in the National Basketball Association (NBA). In the regular season, the Nationals finished in fourth place in the Eastern Division & their 32–34 record gave them an NBA Playoffs berth. Syracuse faced the Philadelphia Warriors in the 1st round of the Eastern Division playoffs and won the best-of-three series 2–0 to advance to the division finals. In that series, the Nationals lost to the New York Knicks 2–3 in a best-of-five series.

NBA Draft

Roster
{| class="toccolours" style="font-size: 95%; width: 100%;"|}
|-
! colspan="2" style="background-color: #D0103A;  color: #FFFFFF; text-align: center;" | Syracuse Nationals 1950–51 roster
|- style="background-color: #0046AD; color: #FFFFFF;   text-align: center;"
! Players !! Coaches
|- 
| valign="top" |
{| class="sortable" style="background:transparent; margin:0px; width:100%;"|}
! Pos. !! # !! Nat. !! Name !! Ht. !! Wt. !! From
|-

Regular season

Standings

Record vs. opponents

Game log

|- align="center" bgcolor="#ccffcc"
| 1 || November 2 || Fort Wayne Pistons || 92–77 || State Fair Coliseum || George Ratkovicz (23) || 1–0
|- align="center" bgcolor="#ccffcc"
| 2 || November 5 || Minneapolis Lakers || 90–87 || State Fair Coliseum || Paul Seymour (18) || 2–0
|- align="center" bgcolor="#ccffcc"
| 3 || November 9 || Tri-Cities Blackhawks || 89–70 || State Fair Coliseum || Dolph Schayes (15) || 3–0
|- align="center" bgcolor="#ffcccc"
| 4 || November 11 || @ New York Knicks || 72–74 (OT) || Madison Square Garden || Dolph Schayes (20) || 3–1
|- align="center" bgcolor="#ccffcc"
| 5 || November 12 || Baltimore Bullets || 83–57 || State Fair Coliseum || Paul Seymour (16) || 4–1
|- align="center" bgcolor="#ffcccc"
| 6 || November 14 || @ Indianapolis Olympians || 78–108 || Butler Fieldhouse || Belus Smawley (15) || 4–2
|- align="center" bgcolor="#ffcccc"
| 7 || November 15 || @ Minneapolis Lakers || 71–72 (OT) || Minneapolis Auditorium || Belus Smawley (16) || 4–3
|- align="center" bgcolor="#ffcccc"
| 8 || November 16 || @ Tri-Cities Blackhawks || 75–79 || Wharton Field House || Ed Peterson (19) || 4–4
|- align="center" bgcolor="#ccffcc"
| 9 || November 19 || New York Knicks || 96–83 || State Fair Coliseum || Belus Smawley (14) || 5–4
|- align="center" bgcolor="#ffcccc"
| 10 || November 23 || Indianapolis Olympians || 85–92 || State Fair Coliseum || Gabor, Hannum (17) || 5–5
|- align="center" bgcolor="#ccffcc"
| 11 || November 25 || @ Washington Capitols || 77–67 || Uline Arena || Billy Gabor (17) || 6–5
|- align="center" bgcolor="#ccffcc"
| 12 || November 26 || Washington Capitols || 90–76 || State Fair Coliseum || Billy Gabor (22) || 7–5
|- align="center" bgcolor="#ffcccc"
| 13 || November 28 || @ New York Knicks || 84–108 || Madison Square Garden || Dolph Schayes (25) || 7–6
|- align="center" bgcolor="#ffcccc"
| 14 || November 30 || @ Philadelphia Warriors || 78–81 || Philadelphia Arena || George Ratkovicz (17) || 7–7
|-

|- align="center" bgcolor="#ccffcc"
| 15 || December 2 || @ Baltimore Bullets || 99–96 (OT) || Baltimore Coliseum || Billy Gabor (31) || 8–7
|- align="center" bgcolor="#ccffcc"
| 16 || December 3 || Indianapolis Olympians || 84–81 || State Fair Coliseum || Cervi, Schayes (16) || 9–7
|- align="center" bgcolor="#ffcccc"
| 17 || December 7 || Rochester Royals || 69–76 || State Fair Coliseum || Dolph Schayes (27) || 9–8
|- align="center" bgcolor="#ccffcc"
| 18 || December 9 || @ Boston Celtics || 86–85 || Boston Garden || Don Lofgran (19) || 10–8
|- align="center" bgcolor="#ffcccc"
| 19 || December 10 || Baltimore Bullets || 76–86 || State Fair Coliseum || Dolph Schayes (16) || 10–9
|- align="center" bgcolor="#ffcccc"
| 20 || December 14 || Tri-Cities Blackhawks || 69–78 || State Fair Coliseum || Al Cervi (15) || 10–10
|- align="center" bgcolor="#ccffcc"
| 21 || December 16 || @ Rochester Royals || 79–75 (OT) || Edgerton Park Arena || Billy Gabor (24) || 11–10
|- align="center" bgcolor="#ccffcc"
| 22 || December 17 || New York Knicks || 95–86 || State Fair Coliseum || Dolph Schayes (23) || 12–10
|- align="center" bgcolor="#ffcccc"
| 23 || December 20 || @ Tri-Cities Blackhawks || 83–86 || Wharton Field House || Al Cervi (19) || 12–11
|- align="center" bgcolor="#ffcccc"
| 24 || December 21 || @ Fort Wayne Pistons || 72–97 || North Side High School Gym || Dolph Schayes (17) || 12–12
|- align="center" bgcolor="#ccffcc"
| 25 || December 25 || Fort Wayne Pistons || 81–69 || State Fair Coliseum || Dolph Schayes (16) || 13–12
|- align="center" bgcolor="#ffcccc"
| 26 || December 26 || @ Boston Celtics || 100–102 || Boston Garden || Noble Jorgensen (23) || 13–13
|- align="center" bgcolor="#ffcccc"
| 27 || December 28 || @ Philadelphia Warriors || 88–91 (OT) || Philadelphia Arena || Dolph Schayes (28) || 13–14
|- align="center" bgcolor="#ccffcc"
| 28 || December 30 || @ Baltimore Bullets || 90–80 (OT) || Baltimore Coliseum || Dolph Schayes (23) || 14–14
|-

|- align="center" bgcolor="#ccffcc"
| 29 || January 1 || Boston Celtics || 106–89 || State Fair Coliseum || Dolph Schayes (21) || 15–14
|- align="center" bgcolor="#ffcccc"
| 30 || January 4 || Minneapolis Lakers || 77–80 || State Fair Coliseum || Billy Gabor (20) || 15–15
|- align="center" bgcolor="#ccffcc"
| 31 || January 6 || @ New York Knicks || 87–85 (OT) || Madison Square Garden || Dolph Schayes (26) || 16–15
|- align="center" bgcolor="#ccffcc"
| 32 || January 7 || Baltimore Bullets || 73–65 || State Fair Coliseum || George Ratkovicz (18) || 17–15
|- align="center" bgcolor="#ccffcc"
| 33 || January 10 || @ Tri-Cities Blackhawks || 97–96 || Wharton Field House || Ratkovicz, Schayes (20) || 18–15
|- align="center" bgcolor="#ffcccc"
| 34 || January 11 || @ Fort Wayne Pistons || 76–84 || North Side High School Gym || Dolph Schayes (16) || 18–16
|- align="center" bgcolor="#ccffcc"
| 35 || January 14 || Rochester Royals || 92–63 || State Fair Coliseum || Dolph Schayes (17) || 19–16
|- align="center" bgcolor="#ffcccc"
| 36 || January 18 || Rochester Royals || 87–96 || State Fair Coliseum || George Ratkovicz (20) || 19–17
|- align="center" bgcolor="#ffcccc"
| 37 || January 21 || Philadelphia Warriors || 86–96 || State Fair Coliseum || Noble Jorgensen (18) ||  19–18
|- align="center" bgcolor="#ffcccc"
| 38 || January 24 || @ Baltimore Bullets || 82–87 || Baltimore Coliseum || George Ratkovicz (23) ||  19–19
|- align="center" bgcolor="#ccffcc"
| 39 || January 25 || Tri-Cities Blackhawks || 113–87 || State Fair Coliseum || George Ratkovicz (24) || 20–19
|- align="center" bgcolor="#ffcccc"
| 40 || January 27 || @ Rochester Royals || 83–85 || Edgerton Park Arena || Dolph Schayes (24) || 20–20
|- align="center" bgcolor="#ccffcc"
| 41 || January 28 || Boston Celtics || 104–83 || State Fair Coliseum || Dolph Schayes (22) || 21–20
|- align="center" bgcolor="#ffcccc"
| 42 || January 30 || @ Boston Celtics || 87–96 || Boston Garden || Dolph Schayes (23) || 21–21
|-

|- align="center" bgcolor="#ffcccc"
| 43 || February 1 || New York Knicks || 90–93 || State Fair Coliseum || Dolph Schayes (26) || 21–22
|- align="center" bgcolor="#ffcccc"
| 44 || February 2 || @ Boston Celtics || 90–96 (OT) || Boston Garden || Dolph Schayes (19) || 21–23
|- align="center" bgcolor="#ccffcc"
| 45 || February 5 || Philadelphia Warriors || 78–75 || State Fair Coliseum || Dolph Schayes (19) || 22–23
|- align="center" bgcolor="#ffcccc"
| 46 || February 7 || @ Baltimore Bullets || 82–102 || Baltimore Coliseum || Johnny Macknowski (20) || 22–24
|- align="center" bgcolor="#ccffcc"
| 47 || February 8 || New York Knicks || 96–83 || State Fair Coliseum || George Ratkovicz (19) || 23–24
|- align="center" bgcolor="#ccffcc"
| 48 || February 11 || Baltimore Bullets || 80–72 || State Fair Coliseum || Dolph Schayes (18) || 24–24
|- align="center" bgcolor="#ffcccc"
| 49 || February 14 || @ Fort Wayne Pistons || 75–77 || North Side High School Gym || Dolph Schayes (18) || 24–25
|- align="center" bgcolor="#ccffcc"
| 50 || February 15 || Boston Celtics || 94–80 || State Fair Coliseum || Dolph Schayes (24) || 25–25
|- align="center" bgcolor="#ffcccc"
| 51 || February 17 || @ New York Knicks || 75–88 || Madison Square Garden || Dolph Schayes (26) || 25–26
|- align="center" bgcolor="#ccffcc"
| 52 || February 18 || Minneapolis Lakers || 91–80 || State Fair Coliseum || Billy Gabor (26) || 26–26
|- align="center" bgcolor="#ccffcc"
| 53 || February 20 || @ Indianapolis Olympians || 81–79 || Butler Fieldhouse || Dolph Schayes (18) || 27–26
|- align="center" bgcolor="#ffcccc"
| 54 || February 21 || @ Minneapolis Lakers || 76–82 || Minneapolis Auditorium || Johnny Macknowski (17) || 27–27
|- align="center" bgcolor="#ccffcc"
| 55 || February 25 || New York Knicks || 98–93 || State Fair Coliseum || Fred Scolari (18) || 28–27
|- align="center" bgcolor="#ffcccc"
| 56 || February 27 || @ Philadelphia Warriors || 72–86 || Philadelphia Arena || Dolph Schayes (18) || 28–28
|-

|- align="center" bgcolor="#ccffcc"
| 57 || March 1 || Fort Wayne Pistons || 108–86 || State Fair Coliseum || Gabor, Schayes (19) || 29–28
|- align="center" bgcolor="#ffcccc"
| 58 || March 3 || @ New York Knicks || 78–97 || Madison Square Garden || Johnny Macknowski (15) || 29–29
|- align="center" bgcolor="#ccffcc"
| 59 || March 4 || Philadelphia Warriors || 85–79 || State Fair Coliseum || Dolph Schayes (23) || 30–29
|- align="center" bgcolor="#ccffcc"
| 60 || March 8 || Indianapolis Olympians || 121–97 || State Fair Coliseum || Noble Jorgensen (27) || 31–29
|- align="center" bgcolor="#ffcccc"
| 61 || March 10 || @ Rochester Royals || 86–107 || Edgerton Park Arena || Dolph Schayes (17) || 31–30
|- align="center" bgcolor="#ffcccc"
| 62 || March 11 || Philadelphia Warriors || 91–95 || State Fair Coliseum || Dolph Schayes (26) || 31–31
|- align="center" bgcolor="#ffcccc"
| 63 || March 13 || @ Indianapolis Olympians || 93–98 || Butler Fieldhouse || Alex Hannum (23) || 31–32
|- align="center" bgcolor="#ffcccc"
| 64 || March 14 || @ Minneapolis Lakers || 76–100 || Minneapolis Auditorium || Dolph Schayes (24) || 31–33
|- align="center" bgcolor="#ffcccc"
| 65 || March 17 || @ Philadelphia Warriors || 86–100 || Philadelphia Arena || George Ratkovicz (20) || 31–34
|- align="center" bgcolor="#ccffcc"
| 66 || March 18 || Boston Celtics || 97–89 || State Fair Coliseum || George Ratkovicz (20) || 32–34
|-

|-
| 1950–51 Schedule

Playoffs

|- align="center" bgcolor="#ccffcc" 
| 1
| March 20
| @ Philadelphia
| W 91–89 (OT)
| Fred Scolari (23)
| Dolph Schayes (13)
| Seymour, Cervi (7)
| Philadelphia Arena
| 1–0
|- align="center" bgcolor="#ccffcc" 
| 2
| March 22
| Philadelphia
| W 90–78
| Dolph Schayes (24)
| Dolph Schayes (16)
| Seymour, Hannum (5)
| State Fair Coliseum
| 2–0
|-

|- align="center" bgcolor="#ffcccc" 
| 1
| March 28
| @ New York
| L 92–103
| George Ratkovicz (22)
| Alex Hannum (7)
| Madison Square Garden III
| 0–1
|- align="center" bgcolor="#ccffcc" 
| 2
| March 29
| New York
| W 102–80
| Dolph Schayes (21)
| Al Cervi (9)
| State Fair Coliseum
| 1–1
|- align="center" bgcolor="#ffcccc" 
| 3
| March 31
| @ New York
| L 75–77 (OT)
| Dolph Schayes (17)
| —
| Madison Square Garden III
| 1–2
|- align="center" bgcolor="#ccffcc" 
| 4
| April 1
| New York
| W 90–83
| Dolph Schayes (34)
| Al Cervi (8)
| State Fair Coliseum
| 2–2
|- align="center" bgcolor="#ffcccc" 
| 5
| April 4
| @ New York
| L 81–83
| Dolph Schayes (14)
| four players tied (3)
| Madison Square Garden III
| 2–3
|-

Awards and records
Dolph Schayes, All-NBA Second Team

References

External links
Nationals on Basketball Reference

Syracuse
Philadelphia 76ers seasons